The 1997 Cincinnati Bengals season was the team's 30th season in professional football and its 28th with the National Football League. After winning the first game of the season, the Bengals lost their next seven games to effectively end any playoff hopes. The struggles cost Jeff Blake his starting quarterback job, as former Bengal starting quarterback Boomer Esiason, who was reacquired in the off-season, came back in to lead the Bengals. With Esiason back under center the Bengals started to win as he connected on 13 touchdown passes, while giving up two interceptions. Under Esiason the Bengals won six of their final eight games, to finish with a 7–9 record. Just as the Bengals were ready to give Esiason the job full-time, he got a lucrative offer from ABC-TV to do games on Monday Night Football. Since he would earn more money on ABC he decided to retire. Running back Corey Dillon set a rookie rushing record (since broken) for most yards in a game. On December 4, 1997, Dillon rushed for 246 yards in a game versus the Tennessee Oilers.

For the season, the Bengals sported new uniforms and a new logo, which would remain until 2003. The new tiger head logo remains in use today.

Offseason

NFL draft

Personnel

Staff

Roster

Regular season

Schedule

Standings

Team leaders

Passing

Rushing

Receiving

Defensive

Kicking and punting

Special teams

Awards and records 
 Corey Dillon, Franchise Record (since broken), Most Rushing Yards in One Game, 246 yards vs. Tennessee Oilers (achieved on December 4, 1997) 
 Corey Dillon, Rookie Record (since broken), Most Rushing Yards in One Game, 246 yards vs. Tennessee Oilers (achieved on December 4, 1997)
 Corey Dillon, Franchise Record (tied), Most Points in One Game, 24 Points vs. Tennessee Oilers (achieved on December 4, 1997) 
 Corey Dillon, Franchise Record (tied), Most Touchdowns in One Game, 4 TD's vs. Tennessee Oilers (achieved on December 4, 1997)

Milestones 
 Corey Dillon, 1st 1000 yard rushing season (1,129 rushing yards)

References

External links 
 
 1997 Cincinnati Bengals at Pro-Football-Reference.com

Cincinnati Bengals
Cincinnati Bengals seasons
Cincin